Edward Turney Applewhaite (November 23, 1898 in Nelson, British Columbia, Canada – September 12, 1964) was a Canadian politician and life insurance agent. He was elected to the House of Commons of Canada in 1949 and re-elected in 1953 as a Member of the Liberal Party representing the riding of Skeena. He was defeated in the elections of 1945 and 1957. He became Deputy Chair of the Committee of the Whole on December 16, 1953.

External links 
 

1898 births
1964 deaths
Liberal Party of Canada MPs
Members of the House of Commons of Canada from British Columbia
People from Nelson, British Columbia
Insurance agents